Masjid Ahmad Ibrahim, or Ahmad Ibrahim Mosque is a mosque in Singapore located at Jalan Ulu Seletar off Sembawang Road in front of Springside housing estate.

History
Masjid Ahmad Ibrahim was built in 1955 and sits on a Temporary Occupation License (TOL) land. It was then known as Surau Nee Soon Jalan Ulu Seletar and its first Imam was Imam Hj Katsir.

In 1959, Ahmad Ibrahim, Member of Parliament for Sembawang Nee Soon and Labour Minister, helped upgrade and improve the facilities of the surau.

In 1961, the surau was upgraded to the status of a Masjid to meet the growing number of Muslims in the area. In a vote for a change of name for the Masjid, the name of Ahmad Ibrahim was chosen to recognise his contributions to the Masjid. The first Friday prayers was held soon after in that year.

Over the years, various other improvements were added to the Masjid, enhancing its capacity to a congregation of around 1,000 people.

Transportation
The nearest MRT station is Springleaf MRT station, it is easily accessible as it is a walking distance.

Alternatively, buses 167, 169, 860 and 980 plies past the mosque.

See also
Islam in Singapore
List of mosques in Singapore

References

External links 
Official website of the Masjid Ahmad Ibrahim
Masjid Ahmad Ibrahim on Majlis Ugama Islam Singapura

1955 establishments in Singapore
Malaysian diaspora in Singapore
Mosques completed in 1955
Ahmad Ibrahim
20th-century architecture in Singapore